, also known professionally as , is a Japanese record producer and former singer and actor. Takizawa first debuted as an actor in 1995, and in 2002, he made his musical debut as the duo Tackey & Tsubasa with Tsubasa Imai.

In 2018, Takizawa retired from entertainment and became the founder and president of Johnny's Island, a subdivision of Johnny & Associates, of which he oversaw the debuts of Snow Man and SixTones. In July 2019, he was made the vice president of Johnny & Associates, a position he held until he resigned in November 2022 to pursue other career ventures.

Career

In August 2017 he was appointed Japan-UAE goodwill ambassador by Taro Kono, the Minister of Foreign Affairs. In January 2019, Takizawa was named the president of a new subdivision of Johnny & Associates called Johnny's Island, where he will manage and oversee the debuts of trainee groups Snow Man and SixTones. After the death of Johnny Kitagawa (the founder of Johnny & Associates) on July 9, 2019, he became the executive vice president of the company. On November 1, 2022, Takizawa resigned from Johnny & Associates to pursue other career ventures.

Discography

Singles

Filmography

Film

Television drama

Songs written by Tackey 
 Words of Love
 Everlasting Love
 894...Hakushi
 Madonna (for DreamBoy musical in 2004)
 Futari no Yoru
 My Angel, You are Angel (for KAT-TUN; released in Cartoon KAT-TUN II You album 2007)
 Fight All Night (for KAT-TUN; for DreamBoy musical in 2004; released in Cartoon KAT-TUN II You album 2007)
 Da.ke.do
 Jūnigatsu no Hana
 With Love
 Ai.Kakumei
 Mugen no Hane
 Monster

Notes

References

External links 
 Tackey & Tsubasa Official Website

1982 births
Japanese male actors
Japanese male pop singers
Living people
Musicians from Hachiōji, Tokyo
Taiga drama lead actors
21st-century Japanese singers
21st-century Japanese male singers